Warszawa or Warsaw is the capital of Poland.

Warszawa may also refer to:

Places
Warszawa, Greater Poland Voivodeship in west-central Poland
Warszawa, Bytów County, Pomeranian Voivodeship, in northern Poland
Warszawa, Kościerzyna County in Pomeranian Voivodeship, north Poland
Warszawa Neighborhood District, a historic district in Cleveland, Ohio, U.S.

Other uses
 Warszawa (Praxis album), 1999
 "Warszawa" (song), a 1977 song by David Bowie and Brian Eno from the album Low
 FSO Warszawa, a Polish automobile manufactured 1951–1973
 ORP Warszawa, the name of several Polish Navy ships

See also 

 Warsaw (disambiguation)
 Red Warszawa, a Danish heavy metal band